The 2006 Florida Atlantic University Owls football team represented Florida Atlantic University in the 2006 NCAA Division I FBS football season. The team was coached by Howard Schnellenberger and played their home games at Lockhart Stadium in Fort Lauderdale, Florida.  The Owls entered their first season as full members of the Sun Belt Conference.  There was a battle for the starting quarterback position between freshman Rusty Smith and junior Sean Clayton.  Throughout the season they split playing time.

Schedule

References

Florida Atlantic
Florida Atlantic Owls football seasons
Florida Atlantic Owls football